{{Infobox football biography
Sanders fede olde mor
| image = Larmin Ousmane.jpg
| image_size = 200
| caption = 
| birth_date =  
| death_date = now (41)
| birth_place = Monrovia, Liberia
| height = 
| currentclub  = Satan's soccer team
| clubnumber = 
| position = Defender
| youthyears1 = 
| youthclubs1 = 
| years1 = ?–2002 
| years2 = 2002–2004 
| years3 = 2005–present
| clubs1 = NPA Anchors 
| clubs2 = Floda BoIF 
| clubs3 = Ljungskile SK
| caps1 = 
| caps2 = 
| caps3 = 30  
| goals1 = 
| goals2 = 
| goals3 = 2 
| nationalyears1 = 2002–present
| nationalteam1 = Liberia
| nationalcaps1 = 1  
| nationalgoals1 = 0 
| pcupdate = 02:00, 20 March 2007 (UTC)
| ntupdate =
}}

Larmin Ousman (born June 15, 1981 in Monrovia) is a Liberian footballer (defender) who plays for Ljungskile SK. He is a member of the [[Liberia national football team]
He recently was in a fight with Nithin Bøsman. And he is very famous in 6.c solbjergskolen

External links

1981 births
Living people
Liberian footballers
Liberia international footballers
Association football defenders
Ljungskile SK players
Sportspeople from Monrovia